The aortic hiatus is a hole in the diaphragm.  It is the lowest and most posterior of the large apertures.

It is located approximately at the level of the twelfth thoracic vertebra (T12).

Structure
Strictly speaking, it is not an aperture in the diaphragm but an osseoaponeurotic opening between it and the vertebral column, and therefore behind the diaphragm (meaning that diaphragmatic contractions do not directly influence the aorta or aortic supply).

Occasionally some tendinous fibers prolonged across the bodies of the vertebræ from the medial parts of the inferior ends of the crura pass posterior to the aorta, and thus convert the hiatus into a fibrous ring.

The hiatus is situated slightly to the left of the mid line, and is bound anteriorly by the crura, and posteriorly by the body of the first lumbar vertebra.

Structures passing through
The structures that pass through the aortic hiatus are the aorta, the azygous vein and the thoracic duct.

Additional images

External links
  - "Major Openings in the Diaphragm"
 

Thoracic diaphragm